Claudio Andrés Videla González (born 19 September 1982) is a Chilean former footballer.

Honours

Player
 Primera B Top-scorer (2): 2003, 2004

External links
 
 

1982 births
Living people
Chilean footballers
Enfoque footballers
Cobresal footballers
Santiago Morning footballers
Universidad de Chile footballers
Rangers de Talca footballers
Deportes Iberia footballers
Deportes Melipilla footballers
Deportes Concepción (Chile) footballers
O'Higgins F.C. footballers
Universidad de Concepción footballers
Santiago Wanderers footballers
Primera B de Chile players
Chilean Primera División players
Association football forwards
People from Rancagua